The 1994–95 Duke Blue Devils men's basketball team represented Duke University in the 1994–95 NCAA Division I men's basketball season. The season lives in Duke Blue Devil infamy, as head coach Mike Krzyzewski, was forced to leave the team after twelve games while seeking treatment for an injured back and exhaustion.

Assistant Pete Gaudet would finish the rest of the Blue Devils' disappointing season with an overall record of 13–18, marking the first time since the 1982–83 season that they failed to finish above .500, won fewer than twenty games, and missed the NCAA tournament. The eighteen losses still stand as the most ever in a single season by a Duke team. This was also the last time Duke failed to make a national post-season tournament of any kind until 2021, when COVID-19 concerns caused them to drop out of the ACC tournament and end their season early.

Roster

Schedule 

|-
!colspan=9 style=|Regular Season

|-
!colspan=9 style=|ACC Tournament

References 

Duke Blue Devils men's basketball seasons
Duke
1994 in sports in North Carolina
1995 in sports in North Carolina